Kala Pul is a US-Pakistani Urdu language topical thriller shot in Karachi, Pakistan. It is S.S. Mausoof's debut feature film and is an exploration of family, regional politics, revenge, and the conflicts inherent in trying to escape one's past.

Synopsis
Saleem Iqbal plays Arsalan. a fugitive, who returns to his native Karachi, to investigate the violent death of his younger brother, blamed on religious fundamentalists. In the ensuing days, he discovers that in a post 9/11 world, the gritty extensive metropolitan city of Karachi sits on the fault line of modernity and militancy.

Kala Pul molds its concerns around universal social factions found in any harsh city and brings together characters operating on the fringes of society, whose obsessions provide fascinating looks into the darker, compulsive side of human nature and its effect on militancy, extremism and greed. The title derives from a bridge in Karachi, which connects the affluent parts of the city to the lower income areas. The lead character of the film grew up under the shadows of the bridge caught between the haves and have-nots – a world of MTV inspired "burgers" (Westernized youth) and the other world of the left behind, fodder for the Kalashnikov culture.

Plot
Arsalan's younger brother, a finance executive with a Pakistani textile conglomerate is killed in a drive-by shooting. The word on the street is that it was a 'hit' arranged by religious extremists as revenge for being swindled by Hamza as he ran their money laundering operations (hawala). Arsalan had abandoned his family for 12 years, he even stayed away when his mother died, but now he decides to go back to find the truth about his brother's death. Arsalan Mirza is a man who can't escape his past and is drawn back to it. He knows that if he returns to Karachi, he will pay for the sins of his past. Still he finds himself compelled and in that way he is driven to commit a violent act of retribution.

Kala Pul uses the thriller genre as the driving force to provide insight on Karachi; a forgotten megalopolis of fifteen million people in Pakistan, a front line state in the War Against Terror. It unites Mausoof with Salim Iqbal, a veteran Pakistani actor who has been given a new opportunity to probe both the underworld vibes of Karachi and the evolving role of a masculine code of honor. Kala Pul will affect different audiences in different ways. This deceptively simple screenplay is the foundation for an absorbing narrative that lets the audience experience issues and images that are not only topical but also relevant not just to Karachites but to global citizens.

Music
The soundtrack of Kala Pul fuses the distinctive ghazal music of the east with the new sounds of drum and bass. Featured artists include Dr Das, formerly of the Asian Dub Foundation and Janaka Selecta of Dhamal SF fame. Dr Das is a bassist, programmer and producer and was one of the founder members of Asian Dub Foundation (ADF), which developed out of workshops he was running in London in 1993. He left ADF in 2006 to resume his exploration of experimental and dub related world music. His first solo album Emergency Basslines (2006) is an instrumental set putting the emphasis back on the melodic, driving basslines he is well known for, but in the context of distorted Indian and Arabic percussion loops. The music, which he terms "dub noise", is reflective of a world in a state of flux and inspired by the work of 23 Skidoo, Muslimgauze and Miles Davis's 70s experimental funk. Dr Das contributes tracks like "End of Empire", "Khapa Militantz" and the title track "Emergency Bass", while Janaka's Boom Qawal and the Escapist fill in the auditory void of Arsalan's head and The Sunrises provides for the end credits. In addition, the movie features music by Pakistani female ghazal singers like Malika Pukhraj.

The final sound design of the Kala Pul film was done by Billy Wirasnik, who has combined his distinct style to layering the sounds of Karachi, which were evident in the prayer call, the cackle of the crows, the noise of the traffic, klaxon horns and the overbearing auditory sense of being in an overpopulated megalopolis.

Making
Kala Pul was filmed over the course of seventeen days in locations in Karachi, which included shooting under the original Kala pul (The Black Bridge) during the 'magic hour', on Turtle beach, which is the last refuge of green sea turtles in Asia, the shrine of Abdullah Shah Ghazi believed to be the oldest Sufi shrine in South Asia, 'Pakistan Chowk' an original old Karachi neighborhood, as well as upscale mansions in Defense Housing Authority neighbourhood. The production team, headed by the production manager Danial Mausoof, was composed of key personnel: director of photography Markus Huersch, focus puller Emmanuel Suys, gaffer Habibullah khan, Sound engineer Chand Mian, art director Maliha Roa, production designer Ali Mumtaz, unit production manager Omer Wahaj and wardrobe manager Meesha Ejaz.

The film was shot by Markus Huersch, an award-winning cinematographer, who has been nominated for an Oscar and has shot films in India's remote Ladakh region as well as in Corbett National Park in India. He is always interested in shooting projects that stretch the limits of his imagination and patience. For lighting, Markus had Arri tungsten, as well as flicker free HMI, Kenoflows, gels, screens and flags. The production was accompanied by a silent generator, spot boys, grips, best boys, and other necessary crew members. It also used an Elemac dolly, and a 35-foot Jimmy Jib for certain shots. For mounted shots, an O'Connor tripod was used. Most shots were done with a one-camera setup, which required a through shot list and a basic floor plan. As the photography team explained, this is what the Germans call a Kammerspielfilm, which is concentrated on the acting. The basic photography was done with an Arri SR3 with Zeiss Ultra primes (50, 85, 135, 180mm) and the Arri lightweight zoom (17-35mm). The feature was shot in Kodak Super 16mm Vision 2 stock with 500T 7218 for night scenes, and 250D 7205 for daylight. This film was especially imported by Kodak (Pakistan) from Singapore, since most photography is done in 35mm in Pakistan.

After wrapping up the production, the film cans were transported via courier to Switzerland for eventual processing and telecine by Schwarz labs. This decision was again influenced by Markus, as he wanted to oversee the telecine in the lab when this happened. The raw digital files were edited in Final Cut Pro and mastered on Digibeta tapes through Zoetrope-Aubry Studios in San Francisco.

Overview
The film premiered  in 2008 at the San Francisco Third I International film festival. Since then it has been shown in Singapore, New Jersey, Lahore, Pakistan and Goa, India.

As of March 2011, the film has:

 Played at the SF Third I South Asian Film Festival, Pakistan, (November 2008)
 Played at the KaraFilm Festival, Pakistan, (February 2009)
 Best Short Feature at NJ South Asian Cinefest (October 2009)
 Short listed for the Asian Festival of First Films in Singapore, (December 2009)
 Honourable Mention at the SAFF in Goa, (February 2010)
 Honourable Mention at the Lums Film Festival (February 2011)

Cast
 Saleem Iqbal as Arsalan Mirza
 Angeline Malik as Zoya Elahi
 Ashok Malani as Suleiman Brohi
 Munawar Saeed as  Professor Dawood Mirza
 Ayesha Toor as Linda Perez
 Nouman Sheikh as Icey
 Murder Kothari as Naufil Elahi
 Saqib Mausoof as Maulana Zahoor
 Kiran Khan as Mona Elahi
 Mairaj-ul-Haque as Usman Mirza
 Ali Reza Mumtaz as Michael Lopez

References

External links
 https://www.youtube.com/watch?v=OZ7LHJEg3c8, Film 'Kala Pul' on YouTube
 
 

2008 films
Pakistani thriller films
2000s Urdu-language films
Urdu-language Pakistani films
Films set in Sindh